Thomas Wylde (c. 1670 – 12 April 1740) was an English politician and administrator. His residence was The Commandery, Worcester.

He was the eldest son of Robert Wylde (c. 1622 – 1689) of The Commandery and his wife born Elizabeth Dennis. He first married in 1696 Katherine daughter of Sir Baynham Throckmorton and Katherine Edgecumbe by whom he was father of Robert Wylde (died 1752) a director of the South Sea Company, and secondly in 1720 Anne widow of Charles Dowdeswell, MP for Tewkesbury 1713–1714, and daughter of Robert Tracy of Coscomb Gloucestershire, a Justice of the Court of Common Pleas.

House of Commons
Under the will of his distant (half second cousin twice removed) kinsman Edmund Wylde (1618-1695) sometime MP for Droitwich Thomas inherited considerable estates including Glazeley, Shropshire enabling a career in parliament.

He was Member of Parliament for Worcester in nine parliaments from 1701 to 1727 and a commissioner of the excise for Ireland from 1727 to 1737 being unable to meet the expense of re-election to parliament.

Posterity

"This Thomas represented the city of Worcester in Parliament, and very greatly impaired his fortune by contested elections. He  was succeeded by his son, Robert, who married a daughter of Charles Dowdeswell, of Forthampton Court, co.  Gloucester, and had issue Thomas Wylde, who, by his  first wife, had issue a son, Thomas Rous Wylde, who  married Anne, daughter of William Russell, of Powick;

and by his second, Elizabeth, daughter and co-heiress of  Ralph Browne, of Caughley, Salop, he was father of a  son, Ralph Browne Wylde, who assumed the surname of  Browne, and was father of the present Thomas Whitmore  Wylde-Browne, of the Woodlands, Salop. (Mr. Ralph B. Wylde-Browne succeeded to this estate on the death of his  half-brother, Thomas Rous Wylde.)

Charles, the second son of Robert Wylde, married a Miss Fewtrell, and his present representative is the Rev. Charles Edmund  Fewtrell-Wylde, son of the Rev. Robert Wylde, vicar of  Claverdon, co. Warwick, and nephew of John Fewtrell-Wylde, of the Uplands, Chelmarsh, Salop, who assumed  the surname and arms of Fewtrell, in addition to, and  before those of Wylde, on the 9th of July, 1852, in compliance with the will of his said uncle."

References

1670 births
1740 deaths
Members of the Parliament of Great Britain for Worcester
Alumni of Christ Church, Oxford
Members of the Middle Temple
British MPs 1715–1722
British MPs 1722–1727
English MPs 1701
English MPs 1701–1702
English MPs 1702–1705
English MPs 1705–1707
British MPs 1707–1708
British MPs 1708–1710
British MPs 1710–1713
British MPs 1713–1715